Muniswamappa Srinivas   is an Indian politician. He was elected to the Lok Sabha, the lower house of the Parliament of India from the  Kanakapura in Karnataka as a member of the Bharatiya Janata Party.

References

External links
 Official biographical sketch in Parliament of India website

Living people
1942 births
Politicians from Bangalore
Bharatiya Janata Party politicians from Karnataka
India MPs 1998–1999
Lok Sabha members from Karnataka